A number of world records and Olympic records were set in various events at the 1992 Summer Olympics in Barcelona, Spain.

Records by sport

Cycling

OR = Olympic record, WR = World record

Sources

References

1992 Summer Olympics
1992 Summer Olympics